Constellation Software is a Canadian diversified software company.  It is based in Toronto, Canada, is listed on the Toronto Stock Exchange, and is a constituent of the S&P/TSX 60.

The company was founded by Mark Leonard, a former venture capitalist, in 1996.  It went public in 2006, and now has 25,000 employees spread over 6 operating segments.

Business 
The company's business strategy is to acquire software companies, and then hold them for the long term. It has acquired over 500 businesses since being founded. It focuses on vertical market software companies (i.e. those that create software for a particular industry or market, as opposed to creating software usable for a wide variety of markets).  Most of its acquisitions are relatively small (for less than $5 million), although the company has indicated that it may pursue larger acquisitions in the future.  For instance, Constellation acquired Acceo Solutions for $250 million in January 2018, the second-largest acquisition in its history. In March 2022, Constellation Software acquired Allscripts’ hospital business unit for $700m. As per the agreement, Allscripts will receive a fixed amount of $670m plus $30M as a performance bonus at the closing of the deal. Although the company has experienced great success with this strategy in the past (its stock has increased 30 times since its IPO in 2006), it has experienced more competition in acquiring companies in recent years, especially from private equity and hedge funds.  As of 2016, 67% of revenue was from customers in the public sector, while the other 33% was from customers in the private sector.  12% of revenue was from Canada, 52% from the US, 30% from Europe, and 5% from the rest of the world.

Operating Segments 
Constellation Software has six operating segments:
 Volaris Group: focuses on acquiring software businesses serving various areas, including agri-business, financial services, and education.  It has more than 150 constituent software businesses.
 Harris Computer Systems: primarily serves the public sector, including utilities, education, and healthcare.  It has 31 constituent businesses.
 Jonas Software: acquires niche businesses or companies in the vertical market software industry. Focuses on B2B and has heavy presence in North America, Europe, Australia and New Zealand. Has 140 companies in its portfolio across 30+ major verticals in 2022, primarily in the hospitality and construction sectors.
 Vela Software: operates 8 divisions, primarily focuses on the industrial sector, including oil and gas and manufacturing
 Perseus Operating Group: operates 56 companies in a variety of industries, including home building, pulp and paper, dealership, finance, healthcare, digital marketing, and real estate.
 Total Specific Solutions: focuses on software companies in the UK and Europe.  Total was acquired in December 2013 for $360 million. In January 2021, this operating segment was spun-off to Topicus.com.

Controversy 
The founder and chairman of Constellation Software, Mark Leonard, has long maintained a low profile, declining media interviews and making few public appearances.

In 2016, the founder of Innoprise Software sued Harris Computer Systems for giving away its software for free, thus reducing the value of a revenue-sharing agreement.

In mid-2018, the company cancelled its quarterly earnings calls, a highly unusual step for a public company.  Analysts suggest the company took this step because it was worried about leaking information about potential acquisitions to its competitors.

Management Team 

 Mark Leonard - President & Chairman of the Board
 Jamal Baksh - Chief Financial Officer
 Mark Miller - Director, CEO & COO
 Bernard Anzarouth - Chief Investment Officer

Source:

References 

Software companies of Canada
Companies listed on the Toronto Stock Exchange
Software companies established in 1995
Canadian companies established in 1995
1995 establishments in Ontario
Companies based in Toronto
2006 initial public offerings